Volocopter GmbH (formerly called E-Volo GmbH) is a German aircraft manufacturer based in Bruchsal (near Karlsruhe) and founded by Alexander Zosel and Stephan Wolf. The company specializes in the design of electric multirotor helicopters in the form of personal air vehicles, designed for air taxi use. The CEO is Dirk Hoke and chairman Stefan Klocke.

History
2011
The company flew the Volocopter VC1 and Volocopter VC2 technology demonstrators, followed by the two-seat Volocopter VC200 prototype. The VC1 was first flown on 21 October 2011.
 

2013
The two-seat project that became the Volocopter 2X started in 2013, evolved from early single-seat Volocopter VC2 prototype flown in 2011. The two seat prototype was designated as the VC-200 and the derived production model the 2X.

An on-line fundraising effort in 2013 on the Seedmatch website raised €500,000 in 2 hours and 35 minutes, setting a new European Union record. The money was used to build the VC200 prototype.

2018
The aircraft entered serial production in April 2018 and will be built under contract by the German sailplane manufacturer DG Flugzeugbau.

2019
On 9 September 2019, Geely, which is also the parent company of Volvo Cars, Terrafugia and Lotus Cars, led a round of funding that raised $55 million in private investments for Volocopter. In September 2020, Volocopter started flying pre-sales promotional trips for Volocity, the company's prospective electric air taxi service.

On 21 October 2019, Volocopter unveiled its "world first air taxi airport", and the company also demonstrated the use of its VoloCity eVTOL aircraft around the Marina Bay vicinity of southern Singapore. The company also conducted a feasibility survey with Singaporean mega ride-hailing company Grab. The demonstration was well-received and supported by the Singapore government. The company worked closely together with various government authorities like MoT, CAAS and EDB to allow test flights for their 'air taxi' service in the area and to fly its first proposed flight route to Sentosa. The demonstration also shed light to promote greater public visibility on the new transportation service to come in the next few years. There was extensive media coverage of the flight testing and the demonstrator vertical airport that Skyports built in collaboration with Volocopter within the Marina Bay area in Singapore, and attracted many people to witness the test flight even though the weather was a little gloomy then. The eVTOL prototype airport is called the "Voloport". After the demonstration, the prototype was dismantled, and moved for redeployment at subsequent launches.

2021
In January 2021, the company confirmed that the ADAC had reserved two of its VoloCity aircraft for operational testing in 2023.

Also in January 2021, the company announced that the FAA had accepted its application to concurrently validate the EASA type certification it expects secure within the next three years. In the same announcement, the company claimed it was exploring launching Volocity within the United States to provide intra-city air taxi services in major metropolitan areas such as New York, Los Angeles, San Francisco, and Washington, DC.

Aircraft

Summary of all products designed and built by Volocopter GmbH:

eVTOL aircraft
Volocopter VC1 (prototype)
Volocopter VC2 (prototype)
Volocopter VC200 (prototype)
Volocopter 2X (prototype)
Volocopter VoloCity (2021 two-seater eVTOL aircraft)
Volocopter VoloRegion (2021 announced new eVTOL aircraft)
Vertical take off and landings eVTOL aircraft specialised airport
 VoloPort
Drones
 Volodrone
Digital products
 VoloIQ

See also
 Air taxi
 Flying car (aircraft)
 Passenger drone

Research 
At the EfeuCampus in Bruchsal Volocopter is testing with partners such as KIT, SEW Eurodrive or Schenker on emission free and autonomous for urban freight logistics. The Living lab is funded by the European Union and the state Baden-Württemberg.

References

External links

 Volocopter at Electric VTOL News

2011 establishments in Germany
Aircraft manufacturers of Germany
Ultralight aircraft
Experimental helicopters
Electric helicopters
Electric aircraft
VTOL aircraft
Prototypes
Proposed aircraft
Urban air mobility